= Alinda of the Loch =

2009 novel by Oonagh Jane Pope and Julie Ann Brown

- First edition cover
- Author: Oonagh Jane Pope and Julie Ann Brown

Alinda of the Loch is a children's fantasy novel written by Oonagh Jane Pope and Julie Ann Brown. The story is a fairy tale about the daughter of Sleeping Beauty, named Alinda. The result of a collaboration between a British primary school teacher and an American college professor, the novel was published by Across the Pond Publishing in 2009.

== Plot summary ==
Alinda experiences a similar curse to the one cast on her mother; However, in this tale, the Shadow Fairy curses Alinda with a 500-year deep sleep. On her eighteenth birthday, Alinda falls asleep, and knowing that they will not be around when she is awakened, the King and Queen find a secure resting place for her and employ a young dragon named Nessie to keep watch of her for those five hundred years.

The story takes an unsuspecting turn when Alinda wakes up staring out of her glass topped bed to a young man named Grant. From this point, Alinda is introduced to an unfamiliar modern world with airplanes, cars, rock music and very different clothing styles.

== Setting ==
Alinda of the Loch is set in Inverness in the Scottish Highlands, and the young dragon employed by Queen Aurora and King Colin to safeguard their young daughter is suspected to be the Loch Ness monster. Alinda of the Loch offers a unique approach to the story of Sleeping Beauty and the legend of the Loch Ness Monster.
